Qutañani (Aymara qutaña dam, -ni a suffix to indicate ownership, "the one with a dam", also spelled Cotañane) is a mountain in the Andes of Peru which reaches a height of approximately . It is located in the Tacna Region, Tacna Province, Pachia District, and in the Tarata Province, Estique District.

References 

Mountains of Tacna Region
Mountains of Peru